Ride On may refer to:

 Ride On, a song by Jimmy McCarthy, covered among others by Christy Moore and Cruachan
Ride On (Christy Moore album), an album (and song) by Christy Moore
Ride On (Izzy Stradlin album), an album by Izzy Stradlin
Ride On (Texas Hippie Coalition album), an album (and song) by American red dirt metal music ensemble Texas Hippie Coalition
Ride On, an album by Albert Järvinen
"Ride On", an AC/DC song from the 1976 album Dirty Deeds Done Dirt Cheap
"Ride On, Baby", a song by Jagger/Richards
"Ride On", a song by Gotthard from the 1996 album G.
Ride On (bus), the bus system in Montgomery County, Maryland